Hyder Bilgrami is an Indian film director.

After graduation with a degree in Commerce from Nizam College, he began acting, directing and producing plays in Hyderabad, India.

He worked with the Bengali playwrights Padma Vibhushan Badal Sarcar and Khader Ali Baig and with directors and production houses including Raj Tilak and national award winner Naga Bharna.

Filmography

Director  
 Ek Doctor Ki Maut (1993) (Indian Mini Series)
 Do Dooni Panch (1995) (TV serial - NEPC Channel)
 Anokhi Kahaniyan (1996) (TV serial)
 Bandhak (2004) (Feature film)
 Chath: A Roof Without Walls (2007) (Feature film)
 Friends Forever (Web Series 2017)

Cinematography 
 Akkarakazhchakal: The Movie (2011)
 Friends Forever (Web Series 2017)

References

External links
 

Film directors from Hyderabad, India
Hindi-language film directors
People from Bilgram
Living people
Year of birth missing (living people)